Omni Consumer Products may refer to:
Omni Consumer Products (RoboCop), a fictitious mega-corporation seen in the RoboCop series of films and television shows. 
Omni Consumer Products (company),  a company that manufactures products based on the fictitious mega-corporation Omni Consumer Products